"Deep Night" is a song and jazz standard with a melody composed in 1929 by Charles E. Henderson and lyrics written by Rudy Vallee. The tune is written in a minor key.

History
The song was first recorded in 1929 by Vallee with The Connecticut Yankees, as the B side of his song "Weary River". These were the  first recordings Vallee made for RCA Victor. Popular recordings in 1929 were those by Vallee and by Ruth Etting.

Recorded versions
It has been covered by many jazz musicians notably: 
Sonny Clark in his album Cool Struttin'
Bud Powell
Art Tatum
Buddy DeFranco. 
It has also been recorded by vocalists, including: 
Frank Sinatra with Harry James in 1951 on Columbia 39527,
Tony Martin on his 1949 album You, and the Night, and the Music ... 
Vic Damone for his 1962 album Linger Awhile 
Ann Richards on her 1958 album I'm Shooting High 
Barbara Rosene on her album of the same name.

Popular culture
Deep Night was also part of the sound track of the films My Own Private Idaho, "Tomorrow Is Another Day" and Bonnie and Clyde. and features in the Score of Matthew Bourne's 2021 dance theatre work 'The Midnight Bell'.

References

1929 songs